The Association of Amateur Football of Ukraine (AAFU) is a sports organization that administers national competitions of association football among amateur and children teams. AAFU is a collective member of the Football Federation of Ukraine.

It was established 2 March 1998 and under the association agreement between the Football Federation of Ukraine and the Association, it is authorized to organize the All-Ukrainian National Football Championship and Cup tournaments amongst amateur football teams. The football championship is considered the fourth level of national competition and is the premier competitions for amateur clubs (professionally non-licensed). Current head (formerly presidential post) of the AAFU is Oleksandr Kadenko.

Amateur Championship

The competitions has taken place since 1964. Previously the competitions were administered directly by one of the Football Federation of Ukraine committees'. Since 1998 the championship is being organized by the Ukrainian Amateur Football Association.

The AAFU teams at the UEFA Regions' Cup
In 1999–2015, AAFU used to provide a team for UEFA Regions' Cup. It was usually a champion of the championship, but there were some exclusions to the rule. The teams did not represent any region in Ukraine, but rather represented Ukrainian amateur football in general.

Teams that represented Ukraine at the Regions Cup:
 1999 – Ukrainian national amateur team, Kyiv
 2001 – Dnister Ovidiopol
 2003 – Pivdenstal Yenakiive
 2005 – KZEZO Kakhovka as Kakhovka-Kzeso (the Russian-like spelling)
 2007 – Ivan Odesa
 2009 – Bastion Illichivsk, was in fact Bastion-2 Illichivsk as the first team was playing at professional level
 2011 – Yednist-2 Plysky, the first team FC Yednist Plysky at that time played at professional level
 2013 – Nove Zhyttia - Putrivka, a united team of both finalists that represent two different regions
 2015 – AF-Pyatykhatska Volodymyrivka

In 2016, Football Federation of Ukraine introduced a new separate tournament called FFU Regions' Cup among Ukrainian regions and not related to AAFU. First season, 2015–16 FFU Regions' Cup, was won by the team of Kirovohrad Oblast based on FC Inhulets-2 Petrove, but to the 2017 UEFA Regions' Cup was sent a team "Ingulee, Kirovograd Region" (in reality represented by FC Inhulets-3 Petrove).

Amateur Cup

The Cup is organized between the Cup holders of the regional tournaments. Every play-off round consists of two legs including the final. The winner of the tournament is qualified for the Ukrainian Cup.

Leather Ball Club
All-Ukrainian competitions in association football for a prize of the Leather Ball Club in three age groups (among under-11, under-12, and under-13) for young footballers.

The main competition is known as the Coca-Cola Cup. The organizational committee is headed by former Soviet footballer from Ukraine Andriy Biba.

The winner of competitions qualify for the Danone Nations Cup.

Heads / Presidents
 1998 — 2020 Fedir Shpyh
 2020 — present Oleksandr Kadenko (acting)

See also
 Regional football federations of Ukraine
 FFU Regions' Cup

References

External links
 Official site 

Amateur
Ukrainian Association of Football
Amateur sport in Ukraine